There have been a number of Transit Agreements for people between states:

Transit Agreement (1972) Between West and East Germany and Berlin.
EEC-Switzerland Transit Agreement signed on 23 November 1972
EEC-Austria Transit Agreement signed on 30 November 1972

Transit agreements also occur for internet packets between ISPs.

Transit agreements